The women's 400 metres event at the 1975 Pan American Games was held in Mexico City on 17 and 18 October.

Medalists

Results

Heats

Final

References

Athletics at the 1975 Pan American Games
1975